Polyaenus or Polyenus (see ae (æ) vs. e; , "much-praised") was a 2nd-century CE Greek author, known best for his Stratagems in War, which has been preserved. He was born in Bithynia. The Suda calls him a rhetorician, and Polyaenus himself writes that he was accustomed to plead causes before the Roman emperor. Polyaenus dedicated Stratagems in War to the two emperors Marcus Aurelius and Lucius Verus, while they were engaged in the Roman–Parthian War of 161–166, about 163, at which time he was too old to accompany them in their campaigns.

Stratagems
This work is divided into eight books: the first six contain accounts of the stratagems of the most celebrated Greek generals, the seventh book contains stratagems of non Greeks and Romans, and the eighth book those of the Romans and of illustrious women. Parts, however, of the sixth and seventh books are lost, so that of the 900 stratagems which Polyaenus described, 833 have survived.

The book has survived in a single copy made in the 13th century, although there exist five abridged versions, which will be discussed below. The full copy once belonged to Michel Apostolios and is now in the Laurentian Library in Florence. The work is written in a clear and pleasing style, though somewhat tinged with the artificial rhetoric of the age. It contains a vast number of anecdotes respecting many of the most celebrated men in antiquity, and has uniquely preserved many historical facts.

There are no less than five Byzantine abridgments of this work, the most important one of which is held in the same library of the original, the Laurentian. This compendium, titled Ὑπoθέσεις ἐκ τῶν στρατηγικῶν πράξεων, contains 58 chapters and 354 stratagems, and is useful to elucidate and explain many passages of the original, lost or not. Despite the existence of the abridgements, Polyaenus' treatise was not popular in the Middle Ages. The original is rarely cited by Byzantine sources, which suggests that it had ceased to circulate, and that the abridgements had replaced it. To this it must be added that only the Ὑπoθέσεις derives directly from the original, while the other four versions seem to be summaries of the first.

Polyaenus was first printed in a Latin translation, executed by Justus Vulteius, at Basel, 1549. The first edition of the Greek text was published by Isaac Casaubon, Lyon, 1589; the next by Pancratius Maasvicius, Leyden, 1690; the third by Samuel Mursinna, Berlin, 1756; the fourth by Adamantios Korais, Paris, 1809. The work has been translated into English by R. Shepherd, London, 1793; into German by Seybold, Frankfurt, 1793–94, and by Blume, Stuttgart, 1834.

Other works
Polyaenus also wrote several other works, all of which have perished. The Suda has preserved the titles of two, On Thebes (Περὶ Θηβῶν) and Tactics, in three books (Τακτικά).  Stobaeus makes a quotation from a work of Polyaenus, Ὑπὲρ τoῦ κoινoῦ τῶν Mακεδόνων (For the koinon of Macedonians), and from another entitled Ὑπὲρ τoῦ Συνεδρίoυ (For the Synedrion). Polyaenus likewise mentions his intention of writing a work on the memorable actions of M. Aurelius and L. Verus.

Notes

Further reading

 

 — Gui-Alexis Lobineau (traducteur), Paris, (1840)

External links
Livius, Polyaenus by Jona Lendering
Polyaenus, Stratagems of War, Translated by E. Shepherd, 1793 (excerpts: those stratagems concerning Alexander and some of the Diadochi)
Stratagems of War (complete translation)
Eduard von Woelffin 1887 edition at the Internet Archive

2nd-century writers
2nd-century historians
Greek-language historians from the Roman Empire
Ancient Greek military writers
Ancient Macedonian historians
Ancient Macedonian anthologists
Roman-era Macedonians
Year of birth unknown
Year of death unknown